Stadion Mladost (English: Youth Stadium) is a multi-use all-seated stadium in Kruševac, Serbia. It is currently used mostly for football matches and is the home ground of Napredak Kruševac. The stadium has a seating capacity for 10,331 people. The stadium was the venue for the final of the 2011-12 Serbian Cup.

History
The stadium was built in 1976 in a record time of 60 days. At the time of its establishment, it had a capacity for 25,000 people.

2011-12 reconstruction
Reconstruction of Mladost Stadium began in November 2011; a sum of the equivalent of €1.5 million funded the project. The renovation was complete by the end of April 2012 and the stadium was chosen to be the venue of the 2012 Serbian Cup Final on 16 May 2012. The stadium was officially reopened on 24 April 2012 by Oliver Dulić.

Notable matches

International matches

Gallery

See also
List of football stadiums in Serbia

References

Stadion Mladost
Football venues in Serbia
Football venues in Serbia and Montenegro
Football venues in Yugoslavia